Roberto Sgambelluri (born 6 April 1974) is an Italian former professional racing cyclist. He rode in six editions of the Giro d'Italia.

Major results

1996
1st  Overall Giro Ciclistico d'Italia
1st Stage 7
UCI Under-23 Road World Championships
2nd  Time trial
2nd  Road race
6th Overall GP Tell
1997
1st Stage 6 Giro d'Italia
1999
4th Trofeo dello Scalatore
5th Overall Giro del Trentino
7th Overall Tour de Suisse
8th Coppa Placci
8th Giro dell'Emilia
10th Overall Giro d'Italia
10th Giro di Toscana
2000
6th Overall Giro del Trentino
7th GP Industria & Artigianato di Larciano
8th Overall Volta a Catalunya
2001
4th Trofeo Matteotti
2004
4th Coppa Agostoni
6th GP Industria Artigianato e Commercio Carnaghese
10th Giro d'Oro

Grand Tour general classification results timeline

References

External links
 

1974 births
Living people
Italian male cyclists
Sportspeople from the Metropolitan City of Reggio Calabria
Cyclists from Calabria